Woman Wanted is a 1999 film directed by Kiefer Sutherland (later credited as Alan Smithee). It is based on a novel by Joanna Glass, who also wrote the screenplay. It stars Sutherland, Holly Hunter, Michael Moriarty, and Sutherland's mother, Shirley Douglas.

Premise
The story is about a woman (Holly Hunter) who works as a housekeeper for a widower (Michael Moriarty) and his adult son (Kiefer Sutherland).

Cast
 Kiefer Sutherland as Wendell Goddard
 Holly Hunter as Emma Riley
 Michael Moriarty as Richard Goddard
 Carrie Preston as Monica
 Allegra Fulton as Gracie
 Shirley Douglas as Peg
 Sean McCann as Kevin

Production 
Woman Wanted was filmed in Winnipeg, Manitoba. One of the notable features of the film is that "Alan Smithee" is listed as one of the directors, meaning Sutherland effectively disowned the project. It was the last film to use the Alan Smithee credit, which was discontinued in 2000.

Reception 
The film won Best Independent Feature Film at the Ajijic International Film Festival, as well as Best Feature Film at the Slamdunk Film Festival.

References

External links 

 

Films based on American novels
1999 films
1999 drama films
American drama films
Films shot in Winnipeg
Films set in Connecticut
Films credited to Alan Smithee
Films directed by Kiefer Sutherland
American independent films
1999 independent films
Films produced by Damian Lee
1990s English-language films
1990s American films